Ibn az-Zayyat was the governor of Tarsus from ca. 956 until 962 for the Hamdanid emir Sayf al-Dawla.

Life 
He was appointed to the post sometime before 956/7, when he is mentioned for the first time as going to meet Sayf al-Dawla at Adana, where he received a robe of honour. In late 961, with the support of the populace of Tarsus, he renounced his allegiance to the Hamdanid ruler, acknowledging the Abbasid caliph al-Muti instead. In early 962 however he was faced with the invasion of Cilicia by the Byzantine commander-in-chief Nikephoros Phokas, who seized the fortress of Ayn Zarba and pillaged the Cilician countryside. Ibn az-Zayyat with an army of 4,000 Tarsians tried to oppose the Byzantine general, but he was defeated with heavy losses, including Ibn az-Zayyat's own brother. Following this defeat, the people of Tarsus once again turned to Sayf al-Dawla for protection, whereupon Ibn az-Zayyat killed himself by falling from the window of his house into the Berdan River (February 962), although at least one source (the 13th-century historian Yaqut) reports that he was present at the final surrender of Tarsus to Nikephoros Phokas (now emperor) in 965. Sayf al-Dawla appointed as his successor Rashiq al-Nasimi.

References

Sources 
 

10th-century births
962 deaths
Abbasid governors of Tarsus
People from the Hamdanid emirate of Aleppo
Arab people of the Arab–Byzantine wars
Sayf al-Dawla
10th-century Arabs
Suicides in the medieval Islamic world